Melaleuca decora, commonly known as the white feather honeymyrtle, is a plant in the myrtle family, Myrtaceae and is native to eastern Australia. It is a large shrub to small tree with papery bark, lance-shaped leaves and sweet-smelling, creamy-coloured flowers in summer. It grows in near-coastal forest and swamps in New South Wales and Queensland.

Description
Melaleuca decora has brown or whitish papery bark and grows to the height of a small tree, usually to  but exceptional specimens may exceed  in height.

The flowers are cream-coloured or white, arranged in spikes on the ends of branches that continue to grow after flowering, sometimes on the sides of the branches. The stamens are arranged in five bundles around the flowers with 20 to 40 stamens in each bundle. 

Taxonomy and naming
This species was first formally described in 1796 by Richard Anthony Salisbury, who named it Metrosideros decora. The reason he chose the specific epithet (decora) was not explained, but it is from the Latin decorus meaning "becoming", "fitting" or "beautiful". In 1916, James Britten moved it to the genus Melaleuca as Melaleuca decora.

Distribution and habitat
Melaleuca decora occurs in Queensland south from the Burnett River district and in New South Wales north from the  Shoalhaven River growing in sand and heavy soils in open forest and swamps in coastal districts.

Use in horticulture
Melaleuca decora is a hardy plant that can be grown in a range of soil types, but needs plenty of water and will tolerate poorly drained sites. It is a useful screening plant and flowers profusely.

Gallery

See also
Melaleuca linariifolia, similar looking tree of the same genus

References

decora
Trees of Australia
Myrtales of Australia
Flora of New South Wales
Flora of Queensland
Ornamental trees
Plants described in 1796